A Long Night is a 2015 Nollywood movie directed by Ike Nnaebue.

Plot
A family gets attacked by armed robbers of which should have been a one night robbery, but they did not get access to the money they were looking for so they had to wait till the following morning to get the money.

Cast
 Van Vicker
 Julius Agwu
 Lepacious Bose
 Peggy Ovire
 Bayray McNwizu
 Tamara Eteimo
 Uche Jombo
 Okey Uzoeshi

References

English-language Nigerian films
2010s English-language films